Krasnoyarsk Reservoir, known also as the Krasnoyarsk Sea, is an artificial lake which was created by the construction of the Krasnoyarsk Dam. It is one of the largest artificial reservoirs in the world. In Russia, it now ranks second (after the Bratsk Reservoir).

The top point of the reservoir is located near the town of Abakan, at the confluence of the Yenisei river Abakan. Lower spot - Krasnoyarsk hydroelectric power station dam. The distance from the top point to the Krasnoyarsk hydroelectric power station on the line - about 250 kilometers, but the total length of the reservoir is much more - 388 kilometers. Width at widest points is 15 kilometers. Height of the water's edge - 243 meters above sea level.

In the reservoir flow some pretty major rivers, including the right bank - Tuba, Sisim, Syda, on the left - Biryusa. At the confluence of the rivers flow directly into the previously Yenisei, creating reservoirs formed bays. The most significant of them - Tubin, Syda, Karasug, Sisim, Durbin, Biryusinsk.

The largest settlements located on the shore of the reservoir are regional centers Abakan, Krasnoturansk (located on the Bay Syda) and Novoselovo. Bridges over the reservoir absent nearest bridge across the Yenisei located a few kilometers above and below the reservoir. However, through the reservoir ferry connections, particularly from the villages and Novoselovo Bellyk. Until the early 1990s, there was a passenger-carrying hydrofoil in the reservoir.

When creating the reservoir, the location of one of the first Russian settlements in Siberia was flooded. It had been populated by Khakassky tribes - Abakan fort (near modern Krasnoturansk).

See also 

 Ship lift of Krasnoyarsk hydroelectric power station

Reservoirs built in the Soviet Union
Reservoirs in Russia
Reservoirs in Krasnoyarsk Krai